Að laufferjum is a 1972 poetry collection by Icelandic poet Ólafur Jóhann Sigurðsson. It won the Nordic Council's Literature Prize in 1976.

References

1972 poetry books
Icelandic poetry
Nordic Council's Literature Prize-winning works
Poetry collections